The White Cloud Lodge, in Payne County, Oklahoma near Perkins, Oklahoma, was a Contemporary-style work of architect Elmira Sauberan Smyrl.  It was built in 1966 and was listed on the National Register of Historic Places in 2010.

The building is a thin shell concrete structure which she designed to serve as a "school for family living", back in 1955 as her thesis project at Oklahoma State University. The builder was John Barta.

Later the building was closed and used only for storage.

References

National Register of Historic Places in Payne County, Oklahoma
Buildings and structures completed in 1966